Li Qingzhao (1084 – ca. 1155), also known as Yian Jushi (Chinese: 易安居士) was a Chinese poet and essayist during the Song dynasty. She is considered one of the greatest poets in Chinese history.

Biography

Early life

Li Qingzhao was born in 1084 in Jinan, Shandong province. She was born to a family of scholar-officials. Her father, Li Gefei, was an academic professor, a famous essayist, and a member of a poetry and literary circle led by Su Shi. Her mother was a renowned poet descended from prime minister Wang Kung-ch'en. The family had a large collection of books, and Li was able to receive comprehensive education in her childhood. Her poems showed her girlish innocence, sharp mind, and love of nature, such as "Happy Memories: Dreamland". Since she was a teen, she studied hard and had an in-depth understanding of literature. As a teenager, she started to develop a career as a poet by writing two poems in shih form to rhyme with a poem by a friend.

Marriage

Li's poetry was already well known within elite circles by 1101, when, aged eighteen, she married Zhao Mingcheng. They had numerous similarities and both loved poetry, literature, sculpture in bronze and stone, painting, and calligraphy. After her husband started his official career, he was often absent from home. They were not particularly wealthy but enjoyed collecting inscriptions and calligraphy. Since Li spent a quite happy time with her husband, her poetic style became calmer and more elegant. Li and her husband collected many books. They often wrote poems for each other as well as about bronze artifacts of the Shang and Zhou dynasties. Her early poetry portrays her carefree days as a woman of high society, and is marked by its elegance.

Unfortunately, their marital bliss was only temporary because of the Jin-Song wars between the Song dynasty and the Jurchens. The Northern Song capital of Kaifeng fell in 1127. Fighting took place in Shandong and their house was burned. Citizens of Zhao country, including Li and Zhao, endured countless sufferings and fled south of the Yangtze River. The couple took many of their possessions when they fled to Nanjing, where they lived for a year. Zhao died of typhoid fever in 1129 on the route to an official post, and Li never recovered. She wandered aimlessly after her husband's death. It was then up to her to keep safe what was left of their collection. Li described her married life and the turmoil of her flight in an afterword to her husband's posthumously published work, .

Later life

Li subsequently settled in Hangzhou, where the Song government made its new capital after the war against the Jurchens. During this period, she continued writing poetry but her later work was full of nostalgic memories of her husband and her hometown. She also kept working on completing the Catalogue of Inscriptions on Metal and Stone. The book was mainly about the calligraphy on bronze and stones; it also mentions the documents Li and Zhao collected and viewed. According to some contemporary accounts, she was briefly married to a man named  who treated her badly, and she divorced him within months. She survived the criticism of this marriage. It is widely believed that she died around the age of 71, but no records of this remain.

Unfortunately, many of her poems disappeared in the following turbulent years, which became an irreparable loss to Chinese literature. Only around a hundred of her poems are known to survive, mostly in the ci form and tracing her varying fortunes in life. A few poems in the shi form also survived, as did the afterword to Catalogue of Inscriptions on Metal and Stone and a study of ci poetry.

Poems 
Li's life was full of twists and turns and her poems can be split into two main parts - the dividing line being when she moved to the south. During the early period, most of her poems were related to her feelings as a maiden. They were more like love poems. After her move to the south, they were closely linked with her hatred of the war against the Jurchens and her patriotism. She is credited with the first detailed critique of the metrics of Chinese poetry. She was regarded as a master of the "subtle and concise style" :zh:婉約派.

One of Li's famous ci poems is "A Dream Song", written when she was living in Jinan and recalling the events of her hometown before her marriage. Therefore, she wrote it between the ages of 16 and 17 (the second year of Yuan Fu of Song Zhezong, 1099). This is also known as her first poem. Translator Jiaosheng Wang translates as:

《如梦令•常记溪亭日暮》

常记溪亭日暮，

沉醉不知归路。

兴尽晚回舟，

误入藕花深处。

争渡，争渡，惊起一滩鸥鹭。

It was a day at Brookside pavilion[1]

That I often fondly remember,

When, flushed with wine

We could hardly tear ourselves away

From the beautiful view of sunset.

Returning late by boat

When we'd enjoyed our fill,

We got lost and strayed

To where the clustered lotuses

Were at their thickest.

Pushing and thrashing,

Pushing and thrashing as best we could,

We scared into flight

A shoreful of dozing egrets and gulls.

[1] A beauty spot in present-day Jinhua, Zhejiang Province, where the poet spent her girlhood years, and made delightful excursions to the suburb, which she ever afterwards fondly remembered.

 Translator Yang Sai translates it as:

《如梦令·昨夜雨疏风骤》

昨夜雨疏风骤，浓睡不消残酒。

试问卷帘人，却道海棠依旧。

知否，知否？应是绿肥红瘦。

Late night wind howled with light shower,

Still hungover despite my heavy slumber.

Ask for shades to be rolled from sill,

Was told my HaiTang blossomed still.

Oh honey!

But don't you know?

Tis the season reds ebb and greens flow.

Memorial Hall in China

Shandong Zhangqiu Memorial Hall

"Qingzhao Garden" is located at the bank of Baimai Spring in Mingshui, covering 18,000 square meters, including 1,270 square meters of buildings, 1,500 square meters of water, and 10,000 square meters of green space. It was officially opened on May 1, 1997, and is the most significant memorial to Li.

Shandong Qingzhou Memorial Hall

Qingzhou Li Qingzhao Memorial Hall is located at the Yangxi Lake outside the west gate of Qingzhou Ancient City. It covers an area of about 630 square meters. The building faces south; there are tunnels in the entrance to the north, road east built, shun river building, west of the four pine pavilion, are of Qing dynasty architecture. At the end of the corridor is a quadrillion built in 1993; on the door, there is a well-known poet Xiao Lao writing tablet "Li Qingzhao Memorial Hall".

Shandong Jinan Memorial Hall

Jinan Li Qingzhao Memorial Hall is located in Baotu Spring Park, in a courtyard on the north side of Liuxu Spring, with 360 square meters. In the Northern Song dynasty, this courtyard was the courtyard of the Zhang family in Jinan. In the Jin dynasty, it was changed to Linquan Running. In the late Qing dynasty, it was changed to the ancestral temple of Ding Baozhen. In the early Qing dynasty, the poet Tian Wen wrote a poem titled "Visiting Li Yian Old House at Liuxu Spring." People mistakenly thought that Li's former residence was near Liuxu Spring. Later, literati and poets all joined the club. Thus it was said that Li's old house was in Jinan. Moreover, Li was once respected as the lotus root god and was enshrined in the Lotus Shrine beside Daming Lake in Jinan. Since the Qing dynasty, Jinan people have been awarded Li "Lotus Godness" for sacrificing.

Zhejiang Jinhua Memorial Hall
Jinhua Li Qingzhao Memorial Hall is located in the southern corner of Jinhua City, Bayong Road. Ba Yong Lou was built by Shen Yue, governor of Dongyang, in the first year of Qilongchang in the Southern dynasty. In 1994, Ba Yong Lou Cultural Relics Conservation and Management Office changed the main hall of Ba Yong Lou into Li Qingzhao Memorial Hall.

Zhejiang Hangzhou Memorial Hall

Since Li Qingzhao once lived near Qingbo Gate of West Lake in Hangzhou, the relevant authorities built the Qingzhao Pavilion in the Stream of the Metasequoia forest in the Willow Waves And Orioles Park, which was opened in 2002.

Modern References
Two impact craters, Li Ch'ing-Chao on Mercury and Li Qingzhao on Venus, are named after her.

"A Dream Song" and "Sheng Sheng Man"  have been set to music as part of the song cycle 'Chinese Memories' by composer Johan Famaey in 2011.

In 2017, the composer Karol Beffa wrote Fragments of China (Klarthe), setting four of her poems to music. River of Stars, a novel by Guy Gavriel Kay set in a fictionalized Song China, features a protagonist inspired by Li Qingzhao, as acknowledged by the author in the book.

Notes

References

.
.

Further reading
 Egan, Ronald [translator], Shields, Anna M. [editor] (January 2019). The Works of Li Qingzhao .  De Gruyter Mouton.

External links

Li Qinzhao's cí poetry
Li Qingzhao's poetry
Selection of her poetry from Famous Poets & Poems
Entry on Li Qingzhao from Other Women's Voices
 

1084 births
1150s deaths
11th-century Chinese poets
11th-century Chinese women writers
12th-century Chinese poets
12th-century Chinese women writers
Chinese epigraphers
Chinese women essayists
Chinese women poets
Poets from Shandong
Song dynasty essayists
Song dynasty poets
Writers from Jinan
12th-century antiquarians